Nitro is a steel roller coaster located at Six Flags Great Adventure in Jackson Township, New Jersey. Manufactured by Bolliger & Mabillard, the Hyper Coaster model opened to the public on April 7, 2001. Since its debut, Nitro has consistently ranked high among steel coasters in the annual Golden Ticket Awards from Amusement Today, peaking in third place during its tenure.

History
In August 2000, land preparation of a new attraction began right behind some maintenance buildings. Several concrete footers were being poured in September. The construction was visible from the patio of the Captain Jack's restaurant. Workers continued to work in the forest and the shores of Prospertown Lake. Vertical construction began in December 2000 and the new attraction would cover  of land.

On February 1, 2001, Six Flags Great Adventure confirmed that the new attraction would be named Nitro and be a hypercoaster. The ride would be the third Bolliger & Mabillard roller coaster at the park, with the other two being Batman: The Ride and Medusa. Billed as the most explosive coaster on the planet, it would be the largest single investment in 27 years.

Nitro was completed on time, opening to the general public at the start of the 2001 season on April 7. Four days later on April 11, the park hosted a special event. Former WWE wrestler Mick Foley slid down the handle of a detonator as fireworks exploded above the queue line and one of the trains exited the station.

Ride experience

Layout
After leaving the station, the train makes a left U-turn and ascends a  lift hill. The train then ascends a  hill and dives down to the left, coasting over another large airtime hill. Afterwards, Nitro enters an element known as a hammerhead turn, a tight U-turn, which veers to the right. Traveling over another camelback hill, Nitro enters its S-curve and into the 540-degree helix. After the mid course brake run, Nitro travels over three camelback hills, followed by a final brake run before returning to the station.

Trains

Nitro operates with three open-air steel and fiberglass trains with individual lap bar restraints. Each train has nine cars with riders arranged four across in a single row for a total of 36 riders per train.

Track
It was manufactured by Clermont Steel Fabricators located in Batavia, Ohio.

Rankings

Incidents

In the summer of 2014, on a Friday afternoon, Nitro passengers found themselves stuck part way up the first 233-foot high hill of the ride. Six Flags park officials say a power outage to the ride was to blame. No one was injured as a result of the stoppage.  Ride operators climbed up, helped the passengers out of their seats, and down the stairs, NBC News reported.

On Sunday, July 11, 2021, Nitro was temporarily suspended after a complaint was made that a restraining lap bar had unfastened on one of the trains. Following this guest concern, the ride was closed for a few hours. After the three coaster trains were thoroughly inspected by Six Flags' maintenance team and the ride was found to be operating without any safety concerns regarding the lap bar situation, Nitro was reopened with the other two trains.

Notes

References

External links

Official Nitro page

Six Flags Great Adventure
Roller coasters manufactured by Bolliger & Mabillard
Roller coasters operated by Six Flags
Roller coasters in New Jersey
Roller coasters introduced in 2001
Hypercoasters manufactured by Bolliger & Mabillard
2001 establishments in New Jersey